St Lawrence is a Church of England church located in Chobham, Surrey. It serves the parishes of St Lawrence Chobham, Surrey and St Saviour Valley End, Surrey in  the Diocese of Guildford. Founded in 1080, the church is listed as a grade I listed building.

References

External links

St Lawrence, Chobham & St Saviour, Valley End Churches 
Chobham Village Community Website
St Lawrence C of E Primary School

Church of England church buildings in Surrey
Grade I listed churches in Surrey
Diocese of Guildford